Amiais de Baixo is a town in Portugal, and a parish of the municipality of Santarém. The population in 2011 was 1,851, in an area of 6.30 km².

In 2019, Henry Bouchot, of the Whittier City Council, visited Amiais de Baixo for wedding festivities of local residents João and Inez Martins.

References

Freguesias of Santarém, Portugal